Ana Tepavac (née Bajić / Бајић; born 19 March 1995) is a Serbian taekwondo practitioner. Bajić won a bronze medal in the women's heavyweight (+73 kg) class at the 2013 World Taekwondo Championships. She also won the bronze medal at the 2014 European Championships.

External links

1995 births
Living people
Serbian female taekwondo practitioners
Taekwondo practitioners at the 2015 European Games
European Games competitors for Serbia
Universiade medalists in taekwondo
Mediterranean Games gold medalists for Serbia
Mediterranean Games medalists in taekwondo
Competitors at the 2018 Mediterranean Games
Universiade gold medalists for Serbia
Universiade bronze medalists for Serbia
European Taekwondo Championships medalists
World Taekwondo Championships medalists
Medalists at the 2015 Summer Universiade
Medalists at the 2017 Summer Universiade
21st-century Serbian women